Brian Kelly (born 20 May 1996) is an Indigenous Australian professional rugby league footballer who plays as a  for the Gold Coast Titans in the NRL.

He played for the Manly-Warringah Sea Eagles in the National Rugby League. Kelly played for Country NSW and the Prime Minister's XIII.

Background
Kelly was born in Lismore, New South Wales, Australia. He is of Indigenous Australian descent from Bundjalung people.

He played his junior rugby league for the Ballina Seagulls and Lennox Head Dolphins. He was then signed by the Gold Coast Titans.

Kelly is a cousin of Brisbane Broncos player Albert Kelly and Wests Tigers player James Roberts.

Playing career

Early career
From 2014 to 2016, Kelly played for the Gold Coast Titans' NYC team. In July 2015, he played for the New South Wales under-20s team against the Queensland under-20s team. In September 2015, he re-signed with the Titans on a 2-year contract until the end of 2017. In May 2016, he played for the Junior Kangaroos against the Junior Kiwis. In November 2016, he signed a 3-year contract with the Manly-Warringah Sea Eagles starting in 2017, after gaining a release from the final year of his Titans contract.

2017
In round 1 of the 2017 NRL season, Kelly made his NRL debut for the Sea Eagles against the Parramatta Eels, scoring a try. On 7 May, Kelly played for Country in the last City vs Country origin, starting on the left wing in a 10–20 loss at Mudgee.

2018
On 8 November, Kelly was released from the final year of his contract to join the Gold Coast Titans on a two-year deal.

2019
Kelly made a total of 23 appearances for the Gold Coast in the 2019 NRL season as the club endured a horror year on and off the field.  During the halfway mark of the season, head coach Garth Brennan was sacked by the club after a string of poor results.  The Gold Coast managed to win only 4 games for the entire season and finished last claiming the Wooden Spoon.

2020
During the 2020 COVID-19 pandemic and under new NRL biosecurity measures Kelly refused to vaccinate against the flu. He was stood down from the Titans after the Queensland Government stood by the flu vaccination measures previously agreed to by the NRL that 100% of players would be vaccinated prior to the competition restarting. He was given a last minute reprieve from suspension after agreeing to vaccinate.

2021
Kelly played 21 games for the Gold Coast in the 2021 NRL season including the club's elimination final loss to the Sydney Roosters.

2022
In round 24 of the 2022 NRL season, Kelly was sent off for a dangerous tackle in the Gold Coast's 36-26 spoon bowl match victory over Newcastle.
Kelly played a total of 17 games for the Gold Coast in the 2022 season scoring seven tries as the club finished 13th on the table.

References

External links

Gold Coast Titans profile
Manly Sea Eagles profile
Manly Warringah Sea Eagles profile
NRL profile

1996 births
Living people
Australian rugby league players
Bundjalung people
Country New South Wales Origin rugby league team players
Indigenous Australian rugby league players
Manly Warringah Sea Eagles players
Junior Kangaroos players
Rugby league centres
Rugby league wingers
Gold Coast Titans players
Prime Minister's XIII players
Rugby league players from Lismore, New South Wales